The 1975 South African Grand Prix (formally the XXI Lucky Strike Grand Prix of South Africa) was a Formula One motor race held at Kyalami on 1 March 1975. It was race 3 of 14 in both the 1975 World Championship of Drivers and the 1975 International Cup for Formula One Manufacturers. It was the 21st South African Grand Prix since the first Grand Prix was held in 1934 and the ninth to be held at Kyalami just outside Johannesburg. It was held over 78 laps of the four kilometre circuit for a race distance of 320 kilometres.

Jody Scheckter became the first South African driver to win the race. Driving a Tyrrell 007, he took over the lead of the race from Carlos Pace on lap three and took a three-second win over the Brabham BT44B of Carlos Reutemann. Scheckter's Tyrrell teammate Patrick Depailler finished third.

Race summary 

Ferrari had used the free month of February profitably, producing the new 312T model with a new transverse gearbox. There was also a new face in the persona of female Italian racer Lella Lombardi.

In practice, Graham Hill's car spun on oil dropped from Ronnie Peterson's car and crashed, destroying his car. He opted to sit out the race. Once the debris had been cleared and holes in the catch fencing mended, there was a second accident as Niki Lauda spun on engine oil, hitting the wall at 120 mph. With further violent accidents to Jody Scheckter and Guy Tunmer, the drivers deemed the circuit not safe and refused to continue until fencing defects were remedied and the track improved, further helped by the support of mechanics who insisted no more practice be carried out.

When the racing got under way, Carlos Pace led from pole in a Brabham 1–2 but was soon passed by Jody Scheckter and Carlos Reutemann after experiencing braking problems, and Patrick Depailler soon climbed to third. James Hunt retired with a broken throttle linkage, Vittorio Brambilla with oil cooler problems and Ian Scheckter crashed. Emerson Fittipaldi was challenging Depailler for 4th place when he suffered a cracked plug lead. Jody Scheckter held on from Reutemann for his only home win.

Classification

Qualifying

*Positions in red indicate entries that failed to qualify.

Race

Championship standings after the race

Drivers' Championship standings

Constructors' Championship standings

Note: Only the top five positions are included for both sets of standings.

References

South African Grand Prix
South African Grand Prix
Grand Prix
March 1975 sports events in Africa